In enzymology, a gentamicin 2'-N-acetyltransferase is an enzyme that catalyzes the chemical reaction

acetyl-CoA + gentamicin C1a  CoA + N2'-acetylgentamicin C1a

Thus, the two substrates of this enzyme are acetyl-CoA and gentamicin C1a, whereas its two products are CoA and N2'-acetyl gentamicin C1a.

This enzyme belongs to the family of transferases, specifically those acyltransferases transferring groups other than aminoacyl groups.  The systematic name of this enzyme class is acetyl-CoA:gentamicin-C1a N2'-acetyltransferase. Other names in common use include gentamicin acetyltransferase II, gentamicin 2'-N-acetyltransferase, and acetyl-CoA:gentamicin-C1a N2'-acetyltransferase.

References

 

EC 2.3.1
Enzymes of unknown structure